Martín Pérez Jiménez (born April 4, 1991), is a Venezuelan professional baseball pitcher for the Texas Rangers of Major League Baseball (MLB). He has previously played in MLB for the Minnesota Twins and Boston Red Sox.

Professional career

Texas Rangers

The Texas Rangers signed Pérez in 2007 for $580,000 as an undrafted free agent. While only making 15 short starts in 62 innings at Rookie-level Spokane, Pérez went 1–2 with a 3.65 earned run average (ERA). Baseball America ranked Pérez as the #17 baseball prospect in their top 100 for 2010.

On June 26, 2012, Pérez was called up by the Rangers. The next day he made his first major league appearance against the Detroit Tigers. He gave up 2 hits and 4 runs while striking out one over two-thirds of an inning. On June 30, Pérez made his first major league start, pitching 5 and a third innings and striking out five while only giving up two runs in a 7–2 win over the Oakland A's. On August 1, Pérez was optioned to Triple-A Round Rock to make room for pitcher Ryan Dempster.

Pérez went into 2013 spring training competing for the fifth spot in the Rangers rotation (which eventually went to Nick Tepesch), but on March 3 in a start against the Mariners, he broke his pitching forearm when it was hit by a line drive by Brad Miller. After making 4 rehab starts (2 with Frisco, 2 with Round Rock), Pérez was recalled to make a start on May 27 in a doubleheader against the Diamondbacks. In his season debut, he went 5.1 innings, giving up 4 runs (3 earned) on 9 hits with 2 strikeouts. After the game, he was optioned to Round Rock. After 4 starts at Round Rock, he was recalled on June 22 to replace Josh Lindblom in the rotation. Pérez threw his first complete game on August 11 against the Houston Astros. In 20 starts with the Rangers, Pérez went 10–6 with a 3.62 ERA, striking out 84 in  innings.

On November 7, 2013, Pérez signed a four-year, $12.5 million contract with the Rangers that included three club options, keeping him under team control through 2020. He received a $1 million signing bonus, and was to earn $750,000 in 2014, $1 million in 2015, $2.9 million in 2016, and $4.4 million in 2017. The 2018 option was worth $6 million and had a $2.45 million buyout. The 2019 option was worth $7.5 million and had a $750,000 buyout. The 2020 option was worth $9 million and has a $750,000 buyout.

On April 23, 2014, Pérez threw nine shutout innings against the Oakland A's to secure his second consecutive complete game shutout. After several ineffective starts following the shutouts, Pérez was placed on the disabled list due to inflammation in his pitching elbow. On May 19, 2014, Pérez underwent Tommy John surgery to repair a partially torn UCL in the aforementioned elbow, which kept him out of action for the remainder of 2014. Pérez began the 2015 season on the 60-day disabled list to continue recovery from Tommy John surgery. 

Pérez had his first major league hit on July 15, 2016, against Chicago Cubs' pitcher Kyle Hendricks. He hit a single to Kris Bryant. He had been hitless his first nine at bats. In 2016 he was 10–11 and had the fewest strikeouts per 9 innings in the major leagues (4.67). He had more batters reach base against him on errors, 16, than any other pitcher in the major leagues.

In 2017, Pérez was 13–12 with a 4.32 ERA, and had the highest WHIP among major league pitchers (1.48). He also had the highest line drive percentage allowed (24.8%) of all major league pitchers.

On April 30, 2018, Pérez was placed on the disabled list with discomfort in his right elbow. He was activated on July 14, replacing Alex Claudio, who was placed on the disabled list. In 2018, he was 2–7 with a 6.22 ERA.

Minnesota Twins
On January 30, 2019, Pérez signed a one-year contract with the Minnesota Twins. He was expected to compete for the fifth spot in the starting rotation.

During the 2019 season, he made 32 appearances with 29 starts, with a WHIP of 1.52, the highest in the major leagues. He compiled a 10–7 record in  innings pitched. After the season, he became a free agent.

Boston Red Sox
On December 19, 2019, Pérez signed a one-year contract with the Boston Red Sox; the contract also included a team option for the 2021 season. Overall with the 2020 Red Sox, Pérez appeared in 12 games (all starts), compiling a 3–5 record with 4.50 ERA and 46 strikeouts in 62 innings pitched. He led the AL in walks per nine innings pitched, with 4.1, and in lowest strikeout/walk ratio, at 1.64. On November 1, the Red Sox declined to exercise their $6.85 million option for Pérez for the 2021 season, paying him a $500,000 buyout and making him a free agent.
 
On February 12, 2021, Pérez officially re-signed with the Red Sox on a one-year, $4.5 million contract. On February 17, MLB.com mistakenly announced that Perez would be switching his uniform number to 33, which had not been issued by the Red Sox since Jason Varitek's retirement in 2012; Pérez clarified that this was an error and that he had no intention of changing numbers. He began the season in the Red Sox rotation, then was moved to the bullpen in early August. On August 30, Pérez was placed on the COVID-related injured list; he returned to the team on September 14. Overall during the regular season, Pérez made 36 appearances (22 starts) for Boston, compiling a 7–8 record with 4.74 ERA; he struck out 97 batters in 114 innings. In the postseason, he made four relief appearances against Houston in the American League Championship Series, allowing five runs in three innings. On November 7, the team declined to exercise their $6 million option on Pérez for 2022, making him a free agent again.

Texas Rangers (second stint)
On March 14, 2022, Pérez signed a one-year, $4 million contract with the Texas Rangers.  On May 29, Pérez took perfect game bid versus the Houston Astros into the seventh inning until Chas McCormick led off with a double. Pérez was selected as an American League All-Star in 2022. Over 32 starts in 2022, he posted a 12–8 record with a 2.89 ERA and 169 strikeouts over  innings. On November 15, 2022, Pérez accepted a one-year qualifying offer worth $19.65 million to return to Texas for the 2023 season.

Pitching style
His velocity is not that of a power pitcher, but his pitches have good movement. In 2007, when he was first signed by the Rangers, he was likened to be a cross between Johan Santana and Greg Maddux.

See also
 List of Major League Baseball annual shutout leaders
 List of Major League Baseball players from Venezuela

References

External links

Martín Pérez at Pura Pelota (Venezuelan Professional Baseball League)

1991 births
Living people
Boston Red Sox players
American League All-Stars
Frisco RoughRiders players
Hickory Crawdads players
Major League Baseball pitchers
Major League Baseball players from Venezuela
Minnesota Twins players
Navegantes del Magallanes players
People from Guanare
Round Rock Express players
Spokane Indians players
Texas Rangers players
Venezuelan expatriate baseball players in the United States
World Baseball Classic players of Venezuela
2017 World Baseball Classic players
2023 World Baseball Classic players